Pedha Thandrapadu is a very small village which is located in Mahaboobnagar District in the Indian state of Telangana.

References 

Villages in Mahbubnagar district